Last Weekend is a 2014 American comedy/drama film starring Patricia Clarkson, Zachary Booth, and Joseph Cross. The film premiered at the San Francisco International Film Festival on May 2, 2014. In May, the film was acquired for theatrical release and iTunes/VOD on August 29, 2014 by IFC/Sundance Selects. The film will also open the Provincetown International Film Festival on June 18, 2014. Last Weekend was filmed entirely on location in Lake Tahoe, California. It was the first feature film in thirteen years to be shot entirely in the area.

Synopsis 
When an affluent matriarch (Patricia Clarkson) gathers her dysfunctional family on Labor Day weekend at their Northern California lake house, her carefully constructed weekend begins to fall apart at the seams, leading her to question her own role in the family.

Cast
 Patricia Clarkson as Celia Green
 Zachary Booth as Theo Green
 Joseph Cross as Roger Green
 Chris Mulkey as Malcolm Green
 Devon Graye as Luke Caswell
 Alexia Rasmussen as Vanessa Sanford
 Rutina Wesley as Nora Finley-Perkins
 Jayma Mays as Blake Curtis
 Judith Light as Veronika Goss
 Julio Oscar Mechoso as Hector Castillo
 Mary Kay Place as Jeannie
 Sheila Kelley as Vivian
 Julie Carmen as Maria Castillo
 Fran Kranz as Sean Oakes
 Ray O'Brien as Paramedic

Reception 
In the United States' review aggregator, the Rotten Tomatoes, in the score where the site staff categorizes the opinions of independent media and mainstream media only positive or negative, the film has an approval rating of 38% calculated based on 21 critics reviews. By comparison, with the same opinions being calculated using a weighted arithmetic mean, the score achieved is 4.3/10.

On another aggregator, Metacritic, which calculates review scores using only a weighted arithmetic average of certain outlets across most mainstream media, has a score of 40/100, achieved based on 10 press ratings attached to the site , with the indication of "mixed or average reviews".

In his review in Slant Magazine, Drew Hunt gave it a 1/4 rating saying that "the film's attempt at political commentary amounts to a half-baked treatise on good governance in the face of tyranny and socioeconomic exploitation." In The Hollywood Reporter, David Rooney said that it "is too muted in its catharsis and too overcrowded with superfluous characters to be fully satisfying, but the delicate central performance keeps it watchable."

References

External links 
  Last Weekend Official Movie Site
 
 Last Weekend in DeadLine.com
 Last Weekend in Thewrap.com
 Last Weekend - Blogs.IndieWire.com

2014 films
2014 comedy-drama films
American comedy-drama films
Films set in California
Films shot in California
2010s English-language films
2010s American films